The 2019–20 European Rugby Challenge Cup pool stage is the first stage of the competition in what is the sixth season of the European Rugby Challenge Cup.  The competition involves twenty teams competing across five pools of four teams for eight quarter-final places – awarded to the five pool winners and the three top-ranked pool runners-up.  The pool stage begins on 15 November 2019 and is due to be completed on 18 January 2019.

Seeding
The 20 competing teams will be seeded and split into four tiers; seeding is based on performance in their respective domestic leagues. Where promotion and relegation is in effect in a league, the promoted team is seeded last, or (if multiple teams are promoted) by performance in the lower competition.

Based on these seedings, teams are placed into one of the four tiers, with the top-seeded clubs being put in Tier 1. The nature of the tier system means that a draw is needed to allocate two of the three second-seed clubs to Tier 1. The fourth-seed team from the same domestic league as the second-seed team which was put in Tier 2 will also be placed in Tier 2. Brackets show each team's seeding and their league. e.g. 1 Top 14 indicates the team was the top seed from the Top 14.

Given the nature of the Continental Shield, a competition including developing rugby nations and Italian clubs not competing in the Pro14, the qualifying teams from this competition are automatically included in Tier 4.

Pool stage

The draw took place in June 2019.

Teams in the same pool will play each other twice, both at home and away in the group stage, that will begin in November 2019, and continue through to January 2020, before the pool winners and three best runners-up progressed to the quarter finals.

Teams will be awarded competition points, based on match result. Teams receive four points for a win, two points for a draw, one attacking bonus point for scoring four or more tries in a match and one defensive bonus point for losing a match by seven points or fewer.

In the event of a tie between two or more teams, the following tie-breakers will be used, as directed by EPCR:
 Where teams have played each other
 The club with the greater number of competition points from only matches involving tied teams.
 If equal, the club with the best aggregate points difference from those matches.
 If equal, the club that scored the most tries in those matches.
 Where teams remain tied and/or have not played each other in the competition (i.e. are from different pools)
 The club with the best aggregate points difference from the pool stage.
 If equal, the club that scored the most tries in the pool stage.
 If equal, the club with the fewest players suspended in the pool stage.
 If equal, the drawing of lots will determine a club's ranking.

Pool 1

Round 1

Round 2

Round 3

Round 4

Round 5

Round 6

Pool 2

Round 1

Round 2

Round 3

Round 4

Round 5

Round 6

Pool 3

Round 1

Round 2

Round 3

Round 4

Round 5

Round 6

Pool 4

Round 1

Round 2

Round 3

Round 4

Round 5

Round 6

Pool 5

Round 1

Round 2

Round 3

Round 4

Round 5

Round 6

See also
2019–20 European Rugby Champions Cup

Notes

References

2019–20 European Rugby Challenge Cup
2019